Karl Micallef (born 8 September 1996) is a Maltese footballer who plays as a centre-back for Ħamrun Spartans and the Malta national team.

Career
Micallef made his international debut for Malta on 26 March 2019, coming on as a substitute for Jonathan Caruana in the 85th minute of the UEFA Euro 2020 qualifying home match against Spain, which finished as a 0–2 loss.

Career statistics

International

References

External links
 
 
 

1996 births
Living people
Maltese footballers
Malta youth international footballers
Malta under-21 international footballers
Malta international footballers
Association football central defenders
Pietà Hotspurs F.C. players
Ħamrun Spartans F.C. players
Maltese Premier League players